This is a list of the bird species recorded in Antarctica. The avifauna of Antarctica include a total of 62 species, of which 1 is endemic.
This list's taxonomic treatment (designation and sequence of orders, families and species) and nomenclature (common and scientific names) follow the conventions of The Clements Checklist of Birds of the World, 2022 edition. The family accounts at the beginning of each heading reflect this taxonomy, as do the species counts found in each family account.

The following tags have been used to highlight several categories. The commonly occurring native species do not fall into any of these categories.

 (A) Accidental - a species that rarely or accidentally occurs in Antarctica
 (E) Endemic - a species endemic to Antarctica

Ducks, geese, and waterfowl
Order: AnseriformesFamily: Anatidae

Anatidae includes the ducks and most duck-like waterfowl, such as geese and swans. These birds are adapted to an aquatic existence with webbed feet, flattened bills, and feathers that are excellent at shedding water due to an oily coating.

 Yellow-billed pintail, Anas georgica

Sheathbills
Order: CharadriiformesFamily: Chionididae

The sheathbills are scavengers of the Antarctic regions. They have white plumage and look plump and dove-like but are believed to be similar to the ancestors of the modern gulls and terns.

Snowy sheathbill, Chionis albus

Sandpipers and allies
Order: CharadriiformesFamily: Scolopacidae

Scolopacidae is a large diverse family of small to medium-sized shorebirds including the sandpipers, curlews, godwits, shanks, tattlers, woodcocks, snipes, dowitchers and phalaropes. The majority of these species eat small invertebrates picked out of the mud or soil. Variation in length of legs and bills enables multiple species to feed in the same habitat, particularly on the coast, without direct competition for food.

Upland sandpiper, Bartramia longicauda (A)

Skuas and jaegers

Order: CharadriiformesFamily: Stercorariidae

The family Stercorariidae are, in general, medium to large birds, typically with grey or brown plumage, often with white markings on the wings. They nest on the ground in temperate and arctic regions and are long-distance migrants.

Chilean skua, Stercorarius chilensis
South polar skua, Stercorarius maccormicki
Brown skua, Stercorarius antarctica
Pomarine jaeger, Stercorarius pomarinus (A)
Parasitic jaeger, Stercorarius parasiticus (A)
Long-tailed jaeger, Stercorarius longicaudus (A)

Gulls, terns, and skimmers
Order: CharadriiformesFamily: Laridae

Laridae is a family of medium to large seabirds, the gulls, terns, and skimmers. Gulls are typically grey or white, often with black markings on the head or wings. They have stout, longish bills and webbed feet. Terns are a group of generally medium to large seabirds typically with grey or white plumage, often with black markings on the head. Most terns hunt fish by diving but some pick insects off the surface of fresh water. Terns are generally long-lived birds, with several species known to live in excess of 30 years.

Sabine's gull, Xema sabini (A)
Franklin's gull, Leucophaeus pipixcan (A)
Kelp gull, Larus dominicanus
Arctic tern, Sterna paradisaea
Antarctic tern, Sterna vittata

Penguins

Order: SphenisciformesFamily: Spheniscidae

The penguins are a group of aquatic, flightless birds living almost exclusively in the Southern Hemisphere. Most penguins feed on krill, fish, squid and other forms of sealife caught while swimming underwater.

King penguin, Aptenodytes patagonicus
Emperor penguin, Aptenodytes forsteri (E)
Adelie penguin, Pygoscelis adeliae
Gentoo penguin, Pygoscelis papua
Chinstrap penguin, Pygoscelis antarctica
Magellanic penguin, Spheniscus magellanicus (A)
Macaroni penguin, Eudyptes chrysolophus
Royal penguin, Eudyptes schlegeli (A)
Southern rockhopper penguin, Eudyptes chrysocome

Albatrosses

Order: ProcellariiformesFamily: Diomedeidae

The albatrosses are among the largest of flying birds, and the great albatrosses from the genus Diomedea have the largest wingspans of any extant birds.

Gray-headed albatross, Thalassarche chrysostoma
White-capped albatross, Thalassarche cauta (A)
Salvin's albatross, Thalassarche salvini (A)
Black-browed albatross, Thalassarche melanophris
Sooty albatross, Phoebetria fusca
Light-mantled albatross, Phoebetria palpebrata
Royal albatross, Diomedea epomophora
Wandering albatross, Diomedea exulans

Southern storm-petrels

Order: ProcellariiformesFamily: Oceanitidae

The southern storm-petrels are relatives of the petrels and are the smallest seabirds. They feed on planktonic crustaceans and small fish picked from the surface, typically while hovering. The flight is fluttering and sometimes bat-like.

Wilson's storm-petrel, Oceanites oceanicus
Gray-backed storm-petrel, Garrodia nereis
Black-bellied storm-petrel, Fregetta tropica

Shearwaters and petrels
Order: ProcellariiformesFamily: Procellariidae

The procellariids are the main group of medium-sized "true petrels", characterised by united nostrils with medium septum and a long outer functional primary.

Southern giant-petrel, Macronectes giganteus
Northern giant-petrel, Macronectes halli
Southern fulmar, Fulmarus glacialoides
Antarctic petrel, Thalassoica antarctica
Cape petrel, Daption capense
Snow petrel, Pagodroma nivea
Kerguelen petrel, Aphrodroma brevirostris

Soft-plumaged petrel, Pterodroma mollis
White-headed petrel, Pterodroma lessonii
Mottled petrel, Pterodroma inexpectata
Atlantic petrel, Pterodroma incerta
Blue petrel, Halobaena caerulea
Fairy prion, Pachyptila turtur
Broad-billed prion, Pachyptila vittata
Salvin's prion, Pachyptila salvini
Antarctic prion, Pachyptila desolata
Slender-billed prion, Pachyptila belcheri
Gray petrel, Procellaria cinerea
White-chinned petrel, Procellaria aequinoctialis
Great shearwater, Ardenna gravis (A)
Sooty shearwater, Ardenna grisea
Short-tailed shearwater, Ardenna tenuirostris
South Georgia diving-petrel, Pelecanoides georgicus

Cormorants and shags

Order: SuliformesFamily: Phalacrocoracidae

Phalacrocoracidae is a family of medium to large coastal, fish-eating seabirds that includes cormorants and shags. Plumage colouration varies, with the majority having mainly dark plumage, some species being black-and-white and a few being colourful.

South Georgia shag, Leucocarbo georgianus
Antarctic shag, Leucocarbo bransfieldensis
Crozet shag, Leucocarbo melanogenis

Herons, egrets, and bitterns
Order: PelecaniformesFamily: Ardeidae

The family Ardeidae contains the bitterns, herons and egrets. Herons and egrets are medium to large wading birds with long necks and legs. Bitterns tend to be shorter necked and more wary. Members of Ardeidae fly with their necks retracted, unlike other long-necked birds such as storks, ibises and spoonbills.

Cattle egret, Bubulcus ibis

See also
List of birds
Lists of birds by region
List of Australian, New Zealand and Antarctic birds

References

Further reading 
 

Antarctica
'
Birds